El Turbón is a mountain massif of the Pre-Pyrenees, located in the province of Huesca, the most northerly province in the autonomous community of Aragon, Spain.

It is fairly easy to climb El Turbón, but it is better not to do so in mid summer when this great expanse of naked rock can reach very high temperatures.

Geology
El Turbón has a massive rocky limestone outcrop at its centre made of Cretaceous marl. There are caves and shafts in the mountain. The Isábena River flows on the eastern side, separating El Turbón massif from the Mountains of Sis range.

Features

See also
List of caves in Spain
List of mountains in Aragon
Ribagorça

References

External links

Ascensión a el Turbon 

Mountains of Aragon
Pre-Pyrenees
Two-thousanders of Spain